The 1919 Pittsburgh Pirates season was the 38th season of the Pittsburgh Pirates franchise; the 33rd in the National League. The Pirates finished fourth in the league standings with a record of 71–68.

Regular season

Season standings

Record vs. opponents

Game log

|- bgcolor="ffbbbb"
| 1 || April 24 || @ Cubs || 1–5 || Vaughn || Cooper (0–1) || — || 8,000 || 0–1
|- bgcolor="ccffcc"
| 2 || April 25 || @ Cubs || 6–5 || Mayer (1–0) || Martin || — || — || 1–1
|- bgcolor="ccffcc"
| 3 || April 26 || @ Cubs || 6–3 || Adams (1–0) || Douglas || — || — || 2–1
|- bgcolor="ffbbbb"
| 4 || April 27 || @ Reds || 1–4 || Ruether || Hamilton (0–1) || — || 11,000 || 2–2
|- bgcolor="ffbbbb"
| 5 || April 29 || @ Reds || 1–8 || Fisher || Cooper (0–2) || — || — || 2–3
|-

|- bgcolor="ffbbbb"
| 6 || May 2 || Cubs || 2–4 || Tyler || Evans (0–1) || Douglas || — || 2–4
|- bgcolor="ffbbbb"
| 7 || May 3 || Cubs || 1–2 (11) || Vaughn || Hamilton (0–2) || — || 10,000 || 2–5
|- bgcolor="ccffcc"
| 8 || May 4 || @ Cardinals || 3–1 || Cooper (1–2) || Meadows || — || 7,000 || 3–5
|- bgcolor="ccffcc"
| 9 || May 5 || @ Cardinals || 5–2 || Adams (2–0) || Doak || — || 1,000 || 4–5
|- bgcolor="ffbbbb"
| 10 || May 6 || @ Cardinals || 1–2 || Goodwin || Evans (0–2) || — || — || 4–6
|- bgcolor="ccffcc"
| 11 || May 8 || Cardinals || 4–2 || Hamilton (1–2) || Sherdel || — || — || 5–6
|- bgcolor="ffbbbb"
| 12 || May 11 || @ Cubs || 0–3 || Douglas || Adams (2–1) || — || 15,000 || 5–7
|- bgcolor="ccffcc"
| 13 || May 12 || Cubs || 3–2 (11) || Cooper (2–2) || Hendrix || — || — || 6–7
|- bgcolor="ffbbbb"
| 14 || May 13 || @ Phillies || 2–3 || Jacobs || Hamilton (1–3) || — || — || 6–8
|- bgcolor="ccffcc"
| 15 || May 14 || @ Phillies || 8–3 || Miller (1–0) || Watson || — || 2,000 || 7–8
|- bgcolor="ccffcc"
| 16 || May 15 || @ Phillies || 5–0 || Adams (3–1) || Woodward || — || — || 8–8
|- bgcolor="ccffcc"
| 17 || May 16 || @ Phillies || 8–3 || Cooper (3–2) || Oeschger || — || 1,000 || 9–8
|- bgcolor="ffbbbb"
| 18 || May 17 || @ Braves || 2–3 (10) || Keating || Evans (0–3) || — || 3,000 || 9–9
|- bgcolor="ffbbbb"
| 19 || May 19 || @ Braves || 1–2 || Nehf || Adams (3–2) || — || 2,000 || 9–10
|- bgcolor="ccffcc"
| 20 || May 20 || @ Braves || 3–2 || Hamilton (2–3) || Rudolph || — || — || 10–10
|- bgcolor="ccffcc"
| 21 || May 21 || @ Braves || 4–2 || Cooper (4–2) || Northrop || — || 1,000 || 11–10
|- bgcolor="ffbbbb"
| 22 || May 23 || @ Robins || 4–6 || Pfeffer || Miller (1–1) || — || 4,000 || 11–11
|- bgcolor="ffbbbb"
| 23 || May 24 || @ Robins || 4–6 || Grimes || Mayer (1–1) || — || 7,000 || 11–12
|- bgcolor="ffbbbb"
| 24 || May 25 || @ Robins || 0–5 || Smith || Hamilton (2–4) || — || 18,000 || 11–13
|- bgcolor="ffbbbb"
| 25 || May 26 || @ Giants || 3–4 || Benton || Cooper (4–3) || — || — || 11–14
|- bgcolor="ffbbbb"
| 26 || May 27 || @ Giants || 2–10 || Barnes || Miller (1–2) || — || — || 11–15
|- bgcolor="ccffcc"
| 27 || May 28 || @ Giants || 6–2 (10) || Hamilton (3–4) || Oeschger || — || — || 12–15
|- bgcolor="ffbbbb"
| 28 || May 29 || Reds || 1–3 || Sallee || Mayer (1–2) || — || — || 12–16
|- bgcolor="ccffcc"
| 29 || May 30 || Reds || 9–3 || Miller (2–2) || Ring || — || 6,000 || 13–16
|- bgcolor="ccffcc"
| 30 || May 30 || Reds || 3–2 || Cooper (5–3) || Eller || — || 21,000 || 14–16
|- bgcolor="ccffcc"
| 31 || May 31 || Reds || 10–5 || Hamilton (4–4) || Luque || — || 7,000 || 15–16
|-

|- bgcolor="ccffcc"
| 32 || June 1 || @ Reds || 4–3 (10) || Adams (4–2) || Fisher || — || — || 16–16
|- bgcolor="ffbbbb"
| 33 || June 1 || @ Reds || 2–10 || Ruether || Evans (0–4) || — || 12,000 || 16–17
|- bgcolor="ffbbbb"
| 34 || June 2 || @ Cubs || 0–7 || Alexander || Mayer (1–3) || — || — || 16–18
|- bgcolor="ffbbbb"
| 35 || June 2 || @ Cubs || 1–2 (12) || Douglas || Cooper (5–4) || — || 3,000 || 16–19
|- bgcolor="ffbbbb"
| 36 || June 3 || @ Cubs || 0–1 || Martin || Miller (2–3) || — || 3,000 || 16–20
|- bgcolor="ccffcc"
| 37 || June 4 || @ Cubs || 1–0 (10) || Hamilton (5–4) || Vaughn || Adams (1) || — || 17–20
|- bgcolor="ccffcc"
| 38 || June 6 || Giants || 7–1 || Adams (5–2) || Benton || — || — || 18–20
|- bgcolor="ffbbbb"
| 39 || June 7 || Giants || 2–9 || Causey || Cooper (5–5) || — || — || 18–21
|- bgcolor="ccffcc"
| 40 || June 10 || Robins || 10–6 || Mayer (2–3) || Pfeffer || — || — || 19–21
|- bgcolor="ccffcc"
| 41 || June 11 || Robins || 3–2 || Adams (6–2) || Cadore || — || — || 20–21
|- bgcolor="ccffcc"
| 42 || June 12 || Robins || 5–4 || Miller (3–3) || Smith || — || — || 21–21
|- bgcolor="ccffcc"
| 43 || June 13 || Robins || 3–0 (8) || Cooper (6–5) || Cheney || — || 3,000 || 22–21
|- bgcolor="ccffcc"
| 44 || June 14 || Phillies || 8–1 || Mayer (3–3) || Hogg || — || — || 23–21
|- bgcolor="ccffcc"
| 45 || June 16 || Phillies || 6–5 || Adams (7–2) || Woodward || Cooper (1) || 3,000 || 24–21
|- bgcolor="ccffcc"
| 46 || June 17 || Phillies || 6–0 || Miller (4–3) || Jacobs || — || — || 25–21
|- bgcolor="ffbbbb"
| 47 || June 18 || Braves || 5–6 (11) || Rudolph || Carlson (0–1) || — || — || 25–22
|- bgcolor="ccffcc"
| 48 || June 19 || Braves || 6–5 || Carlson (1–1) || Northrop || — || — || 26–22
|- bgcolor="ccffcc"
| 49 || June 20 || Braves || 4–0 || Hamilton (6–4) || Demaree || — || — || 27–22
|- bgcolor="ccffcc"
| 50 || June 21 || Braves || 1–0 || Adams (8–2) || Keating || — || — || 28–22
|- bgcolor="ccffcc"
| 51 || June 22 || @ Cardinals || 7–6 || Carlson (2–1) || Sherdel || Hamilton (1) || 5,000 || 29–22
|- bgcolor="ccffcc"
| 52 || June 23 || @ Cardinals || 3–2 || Miller (5–3) || Tuero || — || — || 30–22
|- bgcolor="ffbbbb"
| 53 || June 24 || @ Cardinals || 2–9 || Goodwin || Cooper (6–6) || — || — || 30–23
|- bgcolor="ffbbbb"
| 54 || June 25 || @ Cardinals || 1–3 || Doak || Hamilton (6–5) || — || — || 30–24
|- bgcolor="ffbbbb"
| 55 || June 26 || @ Reds || 0–7 (6) || Ruether || Adams (8–3) || — || 3,000 || 30–25
|- bgcolor="ffbbbb"
| 56 || June 27 || Reds || 2–5 || Luque || Carlson (2–2) || — || — || 30–26
|- bgcolor="ffbbbb"
| 57 || June 28 || Reds || 0–3 || Sallee || Miller (5–4) || — || — || 30–27
|- bgcolor="ccffcc"
| 58 || June 29 || @ Cubs || 7–4 || Cooper (7–6) || Vaughn || — || — || 31–27
|- bgcolor="ccffcc"
| 59 || June 30 || Cardinals || 4–1 || Adams (9–3) || May || — || — || 32–27
|-

|- bgcolor="ccffcc"
| 60 || July 1 || Cardinals || 11–4 || Mayer (4–3) || Doak || — || — || 33–27
|- bgcolor="ffbbbb"
| 61 || July 2 || Cardinals || 2–4 || May || Hamilton (6–6) || Tuero || — || 33–28
|- bgcolor="ccffcc"
| 62 || July 3 || Cubs || 4–2 || Cooper (8–6) || Douglas || — || — || 34–28
|- bgcolor="ffbbbb"
| 63 || July 4 || Cubs || 3–7 || Hendrix || Miller (5–5) || — || — || 34–29
|- bgcolor="ffbbbb"
| 64 || July 4 || Cubs || 1–4 || Vaughn || Adams (9–4) || — || 33,000 || 34–30
|- bgcolor="ffbbbb"
| 65 || July 5 || Cubs || 2–10 || Carter || Hamilton (6–7) || — || — || 34–31
|- bgcolor="ffbbbb"
| 66 || July 6 || @ Reds || 1–8 || Sallee || Cooper (8–7) || — || — || 34–32
|- bgcolor="ffbbbb"
| 67 || July 6 || @ Reds || 1–3 || Ruether || Carlson (2–3) || — || 23,000 || 34–33
|- bgcolor="ccffcc"
| 68 || July 7 || Cardinals || 14–9 || Mayer (5–3) || Ames || — || — || 35–33
|- bgcolor="ffbbbb"
| 69 || July 8 || @ Robins || 1–2 || Cadore || Miller (5–6) || — || 3,000 || 35–34
|- bgcolor="ccffcc"
| 70 || July 9 || @ Robins || 2–0 || Adams (10–4) || Grimes || — || 3,000 || 36–34
|- bgcolor="ccffcc"
| 71 || July 11 || @ Robins || 5–2 || Carlson (3–3) || Pfeffer || — || 2,500 || 37–34
|- bgcolor="ccffcc"
| 72 || July 12 || @ Giants || 1–0 || Cooper (9–7) || Toney || — || 20,000 || 38–34
|- bgcolor="ffbbbb"
| 73 || July 13 || @ Giants || 2–8 || Benton || Hamilton (6–8) || — || 27,000 || 38–35
|- bgcolor="ffbbbb"
| 74 || July 14 || @ Giants || 4–5 || Dubuc || Miller (5–7) || — || 8,000 || 38–36
|- bgcolor="ccffcc"
| 75 || July 18 || @ Braves || 2–0 || Adams (11–4) || Nehf || — || — || 39–36
|- bgcolor="ffbbbb"
| 76 || July 19 || @ Braves || 1–2 || Rudolph || Cooper (9–8) || — || — || 39–37
|- bgcolor="ffbbbb"
| 77 || July 23 || @ Phillies || 1–6 || Meadows || Carlson (3–4) || — || — || 39–38
|- bgcolor="ccffcc"
| 78 || July 23 || @ Phillies || 1–0 || Miller (6–7) || Rixey || — || — || 40–38
|- bgcolor="ffbbbb"
| 79 || July 24 || Reds || 1–3 || Ruether || Cooper (9–9) || — || — || 40–39
|- bgcolor="ffbbbb"
| 80 || July 25 || Reds || 0–4 || Eller || Adams (11–5) || — || — || 40–40
|- bgcolor="ffbbbb"
| 81 || July 26 || Reds || 2–4 || Ring || Miller (6–8) || — || — || 40–41
|- bgcolor="ffbbbb"
| 82 || July 27 || @ Reds || 3–5 || Sallee || Ponder (0–1) || — || — || 40–42
|- bgcolor="ffbbbb"
| 83 || July 28 || @ Reds || 7–8 || Gerner || Hamilton (6–9) || Eller || — || 40–43
|- bgcolor="ffbbbb"
| 84 || July 29 || Giants || 0–3 || Toney || Adams (11–6) || — || — || 40–44
|- bgcolor="ccffcc"
| 85 || July 29 || Giants || 7–6 || Cooper (10–9) || Dubuc || — || 8,000 || 41–44
|- bgcolor="ffbbbb"
| 86 || July 30 || Giants || 0–9 || Barnes || Ponder (0–2) || — || — || 41–45
|- bgcolor="ccffcc"
| 87 || July 30 || Giants || 6–1 || Miller (7–8) || Perritt || — || — || 42–45
|- bgcolor="ffbbbb"
| 88 || July 31 || Giants || 2–5 || Douglas || Carlson (3–5) || — || 2,500 || 42–46
|-

|- bgcolor="ffbbbb"
| 89 || August 1 || Braves || 1–2 || Nehf || Hamilton (6–10) || — || 1,500 || 42–47
|- bgcolor="ccffcc"
| 90 || August 2 || Braves || 4–2 || Cooper (11–9) || Fillingim || Mayer (1) || — || 43–47
|- bgcolor="ffbbbb"
| 91 || August 5 || Phillies || 0–2 || Meadows || Adams (11–7) || — || — || 43–48
|- bgcolor="ffbbbb"
| 92 || August 7 || Phillies || 3–5 || Rixey || Miller (7–9) || — || — || 43–49
|- bgcolor="ccffcc"
| 93 || August 8 || Robins || 3–0 || Cooper (12–9) || Mamaux || — || — || 44–49
|- bgcolor="ffbbbb"
| 94 || August 9 || Robins || 0–2 || Pfeffer || Carlson (3–6) || — || — || 44–50
|- bgcolor="ccffcc"
| 95 || August 10 || @ Robins || 5–3 || Adams (12–7) || Cadore || — || — || 45–50
|- bgcolor="ccffcc"
| 96 || August 11 || @ Robins || 5–2 || Miller (8–9) || Smith || — || 2,000 || 46–50
|- bgcolor="ccffcc"
| 97 || August 13 || @ Braves || 3–2 (14) || Cooper (13–9) || Rudolph || — || — || 47–50
|- bgcolor="ffbbbb"
| 98 || August 15 || @ Braves || 3–5 || Causey || Adams (12–8) || — || — || 47–51
|- bgcolor="ffbbbb"
| 99 || August 15 || @ Braves || 2–3 (15) || Fillingim || Carlson (3–7) || — || — || 47–52
|- bgcolor="ccffcc"
| 100 || August 16 || @ Phillies || 6–4 || Miller (9–9) || Rixey || — || — || 48–52
|- bgcolor="ffbbbb"
| 101 || August 16 || @ Phillies || 0–4 || Rixey || Ponder (0–3) || — || 8,000 || 48–53
|- bgcolor="ccffcc"
| 102 || August 18 || @ Phillies || 3–2 (13) || Cooper (14–9) || Smith || — || — || 49–53
|- bgcolor="ccffcc"
| 103 || August 19 || @ Phillies || 5–4 || Carlson (4–7) || Meadows || — || — || 50–53
|- bgcolor="ccffcc"
| 104 || August 20 || @ Robins || 5–1 || Miller (10–9) || Grimes || — || 1,000 || 51–53
|- bgcolor="ffbbbb"
| 105 || August 21 || @ Robins || 2–3 || Pfeffer || Adams (12–9) || — || 2,000 || 51–54
|- bgcolor="ccffcc"
| 106 || August 23 || @ Giants || 6–1 || Cooper (15–9) || Barnes || — || 20,000 || 52–54
|- bgcolor="ffbbbb"
| 107 || August 24 || @ Giants || 0–1 (10) || Toney || Carlson (4–8) || — || — || 52–55
|- bgcolor="ffbbbb"
| 108 || August 26 || @ Giants || 1–9 || Nehf || Miller (10–10) || — || — || 52–56
|- bgcolor="ccffcc"
| 109 || August 26 || @ Giants || 4–1 || Adams (13–9) || Benton || — || 8,000 || 53–56
|- bgcolor="ffbbbb"
| 110 || August 28 || Cardinals || 1–3 || Schupp || Cooper (15–10) || — || — || 53–57
|- bgcolor="ccffcc"
| 111 || August 29 || Cardinals || 5–3 || Miller (11–10) || Sherdel || — || — || 54–57
|- bgcolor="ccffcc"
| 112 || August 30 || Reds || 1–0 (11) || Adams (14–9) || Ring || — || — || 55–57
|- bgcolor="ccffcc"
| 113 || August 31 || @ Reds || 3–2 || Carlson (5–8) || Ruether || — || — || 56–57
|-

|- bgcolor="ffbbbb"
| 114 || September 1 || Cardinals || 4–5 || Doak || Miller (11–11) || — || — || 56–58
|- bgcolor="ccffcc"
| 115 || September 1 || Cardinals || 2–1 || Cooper (16–10) || Sherdel || — || — || 57–58
|- bgcolor="ffbbbb"
| 116 || September 2 || Cardinals || 1–2 || Goodwin || Ponder (0–4) || — || — || 57–59
|- bgcolor="ccffcc"
| 117 || September 4 || Cubs || 4–3 (10) || Cooper (17–10) || Bailey || — || — || 58–59
|- bgcolor="ffbbbb"
| 118 || September 5 || Cubs || 0–2 || Vaughn || Carlson (5–9) || — || — || 58–60
|- bgcolor="ccffcc"
| 119 || September 6 || Cubs || 11–0 || Cooper (18–10) || Hendrix || — || — || 59–60
|- bgcolor="ccffcc"
| 120 || September 7 || @ Cubs || 2–1 || Hamilton (7–10) || Alexander || — || — || 60–60
|- bgcolor="ccffcc"
| 121 || September 8 || Braves || 10–0 || Miller (12–11) || Demaree || — || — || 61–60
|- bgcolor="ffbbbb"
| 122 || September 8 || Braves || 3–4 || Causey || Ponder (0–5) || Fillingim || 2,000 || 61–61
|- bgcolor="ccffcc"
| 123 || September 9 || Braves || 6–3 || Carlson (6–9) || Scott || — || — || 62–61
|- bgcolor="ccffcc"
| 124 || September 9 || Braves || 6–1 || Adams (15–9) || Keating || — || — || 63–61
|- bgcolor="ccffcc"
| 125 || September 11 || Phillies || 7–1 || Cooper (19–10) || Ames || — || — || 64–61
|- bgcolor="ccffcc"
| 126 || September 11 || Phillies || 7–2 || Hamilton (8–10) || Meadows || — || — || 65–61
|- bgcolor="ffbbbb"
| 127 || September 12 || Phillies || 5–6 || Cantwell || Miller (12–12) || — || — || 65–62
|- bgcolor="ccffcc"
| 128 || September 13 || Phillies || 4–1 || Carlson (7–9) || Smith || — || — || 66–62
|- bgcolor="ccffcc"
| 129 || September 13 || Phillies || 2–0 || Adams (16–9) || Hogg || — || — || 67–62
|- bgcolor="ffbbbb"
| 130 || September 15 || Robins || 3–4 || Smith || Cooper (19–11) || — || — || 67–63
|- bgcolor="ffbbbb"
| 131 || September 15 || Robins || 0–6 || Cadore || Hamilton (8–11) || — || — || 67–64
|- bgcolor="ccffcc"
| 132 || September 16 || Robins || 4–3 (11) || Miller (13–12) || Pfeffer || — || — || 68–64
|- bgcolor="ffbbbb"
| 133 || September 17 || Robins || 3–8 || Mitchell || Carlson (7–10) || — || — || 68–65
|- bgcolor="ccffcc"
| 134 || September 18 || Giants || 7–0 || Adams (17–9) || Barnes || — || — || 69–65
|- bgcolor="ffbbbb"
| 135 || September 19 || Giants || 2–4 || Nehf || Cooper (19–12) || — || 2,000 || 69–66
|- bgcolor="ccffcc"
| 136 || September 20 || Giants || 2–0 || Carlson (8–10) || Ryan || — || 10,000 || 70–66
|- bgcolor="ffbbbb"
| 137 || September 26 || @ Cardinals || 1–2 (12) || Schupp || Adams (17–10) || — || — || 70–67
|- bgcolor="ffbbbb"
| 138 || September 27 || @ Cardinals || 3–5 || Goodwin || Cooper (19–13) || — || — || 70–68
|- bgcolor="ccffcc"
| 139 || September 28 || @ Cardinals || 6–3 || Wisner (1–0) || Woodward || — || 500 || 71–68
|-

|-
| Legend:       = Win       = LossBold = Pirates team member

Opening Day lineup

Roster

Player stats

Batting

Starters by position 
Note: Pos = Position; G = Games played; AB = At bats; H = Hits; Avg. = Batting average; HR = Home runs; RBI = Runs batted in

Other batters 
Note: G = Games played; AB = At bats; H = Hits; Avg. = Batting average; HR = Home runs; RBI = Runs batted in

Pitching

Starting pitchers 
Note: G = Games pitched; IP = Innings pitched; W = Wins; L = Losses; ERA = Earned run average; SO = Strikeouts

Other pitchers 
Note: G = Games pitched; IP = Innings pitched; W = Wins; L = Losses; ERA = Earned run average; SO = Strikeouts

Relief pitchers 
Note: G = Games pitched; W = Wins; L = Losses; SV = Saves; ERA = Earned run average; SO = Strikeouts

References

External links
 1919 Pittsburgh Pirates team page at Baseball Reference
 1919 Pittsburgh Pirates Page at Baseball Almanac

Pittsburgh Pirates seasons
Pittsburgh Pirates season
Pitts